Theo Jackson may refer to:

 Theo Jackson (musician) (born 1986), British jazz songwriter, pianist and vocalist
 Theo Jackson (American football) (born 1998), American football player